The Ministry of Religion and Diaspora was the ministry in the Government of Serbia which was in charge of connection with the Serbian diaspora. The ministry was merged into the Ministry of Culture and Information on 27 July 2012.

History
The ministry was established on 11 February 1991. It was abolished from 2001 to 2004. The Ministry of Religion which existed from 1991 to 2011, merged into the ministry in 2011.

The Ministry of Religion and Diaspora was later merged into the Ministry of Culture and Information on 27 July 2012. Also, the Directorate for Cooperation with the Diaspora and Serbs in the Region and Office for Cooperation with Churches and Religious Communities were established on 2 August 2012 and took some of the Ministry's jurisdictions.

List of ministers

See also
 Directorate for Cooperation with the Diaspora and Serbs in the Region
 Office for Cooperation with Churches and Religious Communities

Defunct government ministries of Serbia
1991 establishments in Serbia
Ministries established in 1991
2012 disestablishments in Serbia
Ministries disestablished in 2012
Serbia
Serbian diaspora
Serb diaspora